Hanseatic flags are the banners of Hanseatic cities that were flown by cogs and other ships of the Hanseatic League from 13th to 17th centuries.

History
Originally, Hanseatic ships displayed red gonfalones on their masts, which had a cross at its peak to denote the protection of the sovereign. Red was also the colour used by Danish and English shipping, the English later adopting the St George's Cross. From the second half of the 13th century, the individual Hanseatic cities created various banners to distinguish themselves from other member cities. The red gonfalone remained in use in addition to these flags. The oldest Hanseatic flag is the plain red banner used by Hamburg. Hanseatic flags were mostly red-white and some featured symbols, such as crosses.

Many cities that were members of the Hanseatic league continue to use red and white as their city colours today.

Hanseatic pennant 
In addition to these banners, ships also flew a Hanseatic pennant (Hanseatenwimpel) where the upper half is white (silver) and the lower half is red.

Banners

13th century

14th century

15th century

Other seals and coins

Flags of Hanseatic cities today

External links

 International Civic Heraldry

Flags
Lists and galleries of flags
Historical flags
Flags of Germany
Flags of Poland